The Girl in Lovers' Lane is a 1960 American film directed by Charles R. Rondeau following the adventures of two drifters who get involved with the residents of the little town of Sherman. The working title of the film was The Young and the Damned. It was released by Filmgroup as a double feature with The Wild Ride. It was featured on the satirical television show Mystery Science Theater 3000.

Plot summary
Danny is a young adult from a wealthy family. He runs away from home because his parents are divorcing. Hopping into a railroad boxcar, Danny meets Bix Dugan, a long-time drifter who agrees to mentor Danny. Danny's naivete leads him to a variety of precarious situations from which Bix must extract him.

Stopping in small town, Danny and Bix get jobs in a diner. Bix becomes romantically involved with the waitress Carrie and re-examines his lifestyle. This earns him the ire of Jesse, a troubled character in the town who is fixated on Carrie.

Cast
 Brett Halsey as Bix Dugan
 Joyce Meadows as Carrie Anders
 Lowell Brown as Danny Winslow
 Jack Elam as Jesse
 Selette Cole as Peggy
 Bill Coontz as Bill Coontz
 Emile Meyer as Cal Anders
 Del Monroe as Mugger in Train Yard
 Asa Maynor as Girl in Bathtub

See also
 List of American films of 1960
 Of Mice and Men - 1939 adaptation similar in content
 Hobo
 Mystery Science Theater 3000 - Season 5 (1993–94), Overall Episode: 104,  Season Episode: 9,  Air Date: September 18, 1993

Sources

References

External links
 
 
 
 
 

American romance films
1960s English-language films
American black-and-white films
1960s romance films
1960s crime drama films
American crime drama films
Rail transport films
Films scored by Ronald Stein
Films with screenplays by Jo Heims
1960 drama films
1960 films
1960s American films